Khan Mir Ahmad Yar Khan Ahmedzai  (1902–1979), commonly referred to as "Yar Khan", was the last Khan of Kalat, a princely state within British India and the Dominion of Pakistan, serving from 10 September 1933 to 14 October 1955.

Life
In the 1920s, Ahmad Yar served as an agent of the British intelligence service, reporting on Russian influence and the spread of pro-Marxist sympathy among the poorer Baloch subjects. 

He assumed the throne of the Khanate of Kalat in 1933 and was decorated by the British in the 1936 New Year Honours as a Knight Grand Commander of the Most Eminent Order of the Indian Empire (GCIE).

With the withdrawal of the British from the Indian subcontinent in August 1947, the Indian Independence Act provided that the princely states which had existed alongside but outside British India were released from all their subsidiary alliances and other treaty obligations to the British, while at the same time the British withdrew from their obligations to defend the states. The rulers were left to decide whether to accede to one of the newly independent states of India or Pakistan or to remain independent outside both. As stated by Sardar Patel at a press conference in January 1948, "As you are all aware, on the lapse of Paramountcy every Indian State became a separate independent entity." 

Muhammad Ali Jinnah was Yar Khan's legal adviser in the early 1940s. Jinnah persuaded Yar Khan to agree to accede to  Pakistan, but the Khan stalled for time. After a period of negotiations, Khan finally acceded to Pakistan on 27 March 1948. 

Yar Khan’s younger brother, Prince Agha Abdul Karim Baloch, revolted against his decision and took refuge in Afghanistan to wage an armed resistance against Pakistan, with little support from the rest of Balochistan. He finally surrendered to Pakistan in 1950. Jinnah and his successors allowed Yar Khan to retain his title until the province's dissolution in 1955.

On 3 October 1952, as one of the princely states of Pakistan, Kalat entered into the Baluchistan States Union with three neighbouring states, Kharan, Las Bela, and Makran, with Yar Khan at the head of the Union with the title of Khan-e-Azam. The Khanate came to an end on 14 October 1955, when it was incorporated into West Pakistan.

Yar Khan briefly declared himself Khan again in defiance of the Pakistani state from June to October 1958. On 6 October 1958, the Pakistani government arrested and imprisoned Yar Khan on sedition charges during the 1958 Pakistani coup d'état against President Iskander Mirza but later released him and briefly restored his title in 1962. His arrest triggered an insurgent uprising led by Nauroz Khan in 1959.

Legacy

Yar Khan's eldest son, Mir Suleman Dawood Jan, assumed the title of Khan of Kalat upon his father's death in 1979. On Dawood Jan's death his son Suleman Daud Jan became new Khan of Kalat. He has lived in exile in London since the death of Akbar Bugti in 2006. Chief Minister Abdul Malik Baloch and Sanaullah Zehri have asked him to return to Pakistan. Yar Khan's younger sons, Prince Mohyuddin Baloch and grandson Umer Daud Khan, are both politicians in Pakistan.

Publications
 Mir Ahmad Yar Khan Baluch, Inside Baluchistan: A Political Autobiography of Khan-e-Azam Mir Ahmad Yar Khan Baluch, Ex-ruler of Kalat State (Royal Book Company: 1975)

Further reading

References

External links

 

1902 births
1979 deaths
Indian knights
Khans of Kalat
Knights Grand Commander of the Order of the Indian Empire
Princely rulers of Pakistan
Pakistani royalty
Nawabs of Pakistan
Governors of Balochistan, Pakistan
Baloch people
Nawabs of Balochistan, Pakistan